The Antares Stakes (Japanese アンタレスステークス) is a Grade 3 horse race for Thoroughbreds aged four and over, run in April over a distance of 1800 metres on dirt at Hanshin Racecourse.

The Antares Stakes was first run in 1996 and has held Grade 3 status ever since. The race was run at Kyoto Racecourse from 1997 to 2011.

Winners since 2000

Earlier winners

 1996 - Theseus Frise
 1997 - M I Blanc
 1998 - Wild Buster
 1999 - Osumi Jet

See also
 Horse racing in Japan
 List of Japanese flat horse races

References

Dirt races in Japan